The Royal Hospital Kilmainham in Kilmainham, Dublin, is a former 17th-century hospital at Kilmainham in Ireland. The structure now houses the Irish Museum of Modern Art.

History
A priory, founded in 1174 by Strongbow, existed on the site until the Crown closed it down in the Dissolution of the Monasteries in the 1530s. The hospital was built as a home for retired soldiers of the Irish Army by Sir William Robinson, Surveyor General for James Butler, 1st Duke of Ormond, Lord Lieutenant of Ireland, between 1679 and 1687. Colonel John Jeffreys of Brecon, an old Welsh soldier who had served the Crown loyally during the English Civil War, was appointed the first Master, at a salary of £300 per annum. The hospital got off to a bad start financially: from a petition presented by Jeffreys to King James II in 1686, it seems that most of the original sources of funding had dried up. Architecturally, it was inspired by Les Invalides in Paris which also has a formal facade and a large courtyard. It served as the model for the Royal Hospital, Chelsea, begun the next year.

The Richmond Tower at the end of the formal avenue leading to the Royal Hospital was designed by Francis Johnston, one of the leading architects of the day. This gateway originally stood beside the river Liffey at Bloody Bridge (now Rory O'More Bridge), but had to be moved after the arrival of the railway in 1844 increased traffic congestion. He had placed his personal coat of arms above the arch, concealed by a piece of wood painted to match the stone, his idea being that his arms would be revealed to future generations after the wood became rotten. However, his little trick was uncovered when the gateway was taken down for removal. The coat of arms at present on the gateway is that of the Royal Hospital.

The Royal Hospital Kilmainham graveyards, including Bully's Acre, are 400 metres to the west. A cross-shaft in the former cemetery may be the remains of a boundary cross associated with a ninth-century monastery located at this site.

Following the creation of the Irish Free State the Royal Hospital was considered as a potential home for Oireachtas Éireann, the new Irish national parliament. Eventually, it was decided to keep parliament in its temporary home in Leinster House. The Hospital remained the home of a dwindling number of soldiers until it closed in 1927. It was then variously used by the Garda Síochána and as a storage location for property belonging to the National Museum of Ireland. The large statue Queen Victoria which used to stand in the forecourt of Leinster House, before its removal in 1947, was stored in the main courtyard of the Hospital, as were various state carriages, including the famously spectacular State Coach of the Lord Chancellor of Ireland. The Royal Hospital in Kilmainham was finally restored by the Irish Government in 1984 and opened as the Irish Museum of Modern Art (IMMA).

Every year on the National Day of Commemoration – the Sunday nearest 11 July – the anniversary of the Truce that ended the Irish War of Independence – the President of Ireland, in the presence of members of the Government of Ireland, members of Dáil Éireann and of Seanad Éireann, the Council of State, the Defence Forces, the Judiciary and the Diplomatic Corps, lays a wreath in the courtyard in memory of all Irishmen and Irishwomen who have died in past wars and on service with the United Nations.

In recent years, Royal Kilmainham Hospital has become a popular location for concerts during the summer months. Acts such as Blur, Damien Rice, Tame Impala, Kodaline and Patti Smith have played there in the past. The Frames held their 30th Anniversary show in the grounds on the evening of 28 May 2022 to an audience of approximately 10,000 fans.

Gallery

See also

 Kilmainham Gaol
 Royal Hospital Chelsea (equivalent in London)
 Puyloubier (French Foreign Legion equivalent)

References

External links
 Royal Hospital Kilmainham website

Hospitals in Dublin (city)
Buildings and structures in Dublin (city)
Buildings and structures completed in 1684
Military units and formations established in 1684
Hospitals established in the 17th century
Military history of Ireland
Veterans' homes
Defunct hospitals in the Republic of Ireland
1684 establishments in Ireland
Kilmainham
1927 disestablishments in Ireland
Hospitals disestablished in 1927